William Irvine (November 3, 1741July 29, 1804) was an Irish-American physician, soldier, and statesman from Carlisle, Pennsylvania. He practiced medicine as a ship's surgeon for the Royal Navy before he sympathized with the American Revolution and fought against the British during the American Revolutionary War. As tensions escalated between the American colonies and the British government during the 1770s, Irvine sympathized and allied himself with the revolutionary cause. He subsequently served as a brigadier general in the American Revolutionary War and served in the western theater. After the war he served in the Continental Congress, and later played an active role in ending the Whiskey Rebellion in Pennsylvania. He also served one term in Congress representing Pennsylvania, and was also active in the state's other public affairs.

Early life
Irvine came from a Scots-Irish, Presbyterian family, born near Enniskillen, in County Fermanagh, Ulster, in the Kingdom of Ireland. His Scots-Irish ethnicity and Presbyterian religion would at first prove to be an obstacle in the English-dominated social worlds of colonial America. He graduated from Trinity College Dublin, where he studied medicine and classical literature under Doctor George Cleghorn who would later vouch for Irvine's competency and knowledge of medicine. Thereafter he was admitted to practice where he served as ship's surgeon on a British man-of-war during the French and Indian War. In 1763 he immigrated to the British colonies in America and settled in Carlisle, Pennsylvania. That year he became a delegate to the State Revolutionary conventions held in 1764–1766. In 1772 he married Ann Callender, daughter of Robert Callender, a prominent citizen of Carlisle whom Irvine held in high regard and named his first son after. Irvine had two brothers, Andrew who was an officer in the Continental Army, and Matthew, who was a physician and a surgeon in General Charles Lee's division.  His son, Callender, was born in 1774 and became a captain of artillery and engineers in 1798. Callender would later manage his father's estate at Brokenstraw when Irvine's political appointment required that he move to Philadelphia. His second son, William, enlisted in the army as a captain of light artillery in 1808, and later fought in the War of 1812. Irvine's youngest son, Armstrong, also served in the War of 1812, as Adjutant General of the Militia of the Commonwealth of Pennsylvania. Throughout his military career Irvine was an avid letter writer and, aside from his military correspondence, corresponded regularly with his wife Ann and children.

American Revolution

Irvine served as a brigadier general in the Continental Army during the American Revolutionary War and served under General George Washington, with whom he frequently corresponded. Irvine represented Pennsylvania in both the Continental Congress (1787–88) and after the war, in the United States House of Representatives (1793–1795). He served as a ship's surgeon and settled in Carlisle. He was elected to the Pennsylvania Assembly which granted him a colonel's commission in January 1776 for the purpose of raising the 6th Pennsylvania Regiment. On June 16 of that year he was captured, along with a large number of his fellow officers and men, in Canada at the Battle of Three Rivers during the Lake Champlain campaign and was not exchanged until May 6, 1778. In May 1779 he was promoted to brigadier general of the 2nd Pennsylvania Regiment and arrived in Pittsburgh in November.

On September 25, 1781, Irvine received orders from Congress to command the Western Department of the Continental Army, which was headquartered at Fort Pitt. Although  Lord Cornwallis had already surrendered at Yorktown in October 1781, effectively ending the fighting in the east and virtually ending the war, the conflict on the western frontier continued. Irvine soon learned that the Americans living on the frontier wanted the army to launch an expedition against Detroit to end ongoing British support for the American Indian war parties. Irvine investigated, then wrote to General George Washington, on December 2, 1781, and maintained:
 "It is, I believe, universally agreed that the only way to keep Indians from harassing the country is to visit them. But we find, by experience, that burning their empty towns has not the desired effect. They can soon build others. They must be followed up and beaten, or the British, whom they draw their support from, totally driven out of their country. I believe if Detroit was demolished, it would be a good step toward giving some, at least, temporary ease to this country."
Washington agreed with Irvine's assessment that the British in Detroit had to be neutralized or driven out to effectively end the war in the west. Irvine sent Washington a detailed plan for an offensive in February 1782, that with an estimated 2,000 men, five artillery pieces and a supply caravan, he could move on Detroit and capture it. Subsequently, Irvine convinced Colonel William Crawford to come out of retirement and lead an expedition against Indians in villages along the Sandusky River, which ended in Crawford's brutal execution. The militia troops went back under the command of John Rose, a Baltic German officer from Estonia. Irvine was commander at Fort Pitt, replacing Colonel Daniel Brodhead.  Upon assuming command he discovered and later complained about, the poor condition of the garrison at the fort. 
Upon his arrival to Fort Pitt, he was appalled to find the fort in "a heap of ruins" from annual flooding, and its garrison in such an extremely ragged state. In a letter, dated December 2, 1781, to General Washington Irvine reported, "I never saw troops cut so truly a deplorable, and at the same time despicable, a figure. Indeed, when I arrived, no man would believe from their appearance that they were soldiers..." Maintaining that the fort was untenable Irving wrote to Congress and strongly recommended that a new fort be built four miles down stream near the mouth of Chartiers Creek by the Ohio River. Irvine maintained that this location was inapproachable on three sides, no commanding ground on its fourth, and that the proposed location would have command of both the creek and the Ohio River. Congress being nearly bankrupt declined Irvine's proposition and ignored his other recommendations. Irvine soon received a letter of reply from Washington, dated December 18, that he was "not at all surprised", but explained that under the circumstances involving disputes over command, and issue concerning other involved interests, this was to be expected, and as such the decision to relocate must rest with the Congress.

Irvine became a member of the Continental Congress in 1786 and was selected with John Kean and Nicholas Gilman for settling the accounts of the U.S. Government with the several states.

Later life
Irvine was elected as a Pennsylvania representative in the 3rd Congress, serving from December 2, 1793, to March 3, 1795.
In 1797 he was sent to Pennsylvania as a commissioner to resolve the disputes involving the Whiskey Rebellion. When he failed in that effort he was assigned as commander of the militia troops and ultimately brought an end to the Whiskey Rebellion.

Irvine continued his involvement in Pennsylvania's public life, overseeing and directing the distribution of lands that were donated to war veterans. He served two terms in Congress, serving in Pennsylvania's constitutional convention, and was on the board of commissioners which settled financial accounts between the various states and the newly established federal government.  In the 1790s, Irvine played  a significant role in surveying lands and laying out the boundaries of towns in western Pennsylvania.

Irvine purchased several tracts of land near the mouth of Brokenstraw Creek at the Allegheny River, some of which he gave to his son Callender. The area would soon grow into and become the town of Warren, Pennsylvania. Irvine's eldest son, Callender Irvine cultivated the land, established a general store nearby, and built a fine house on a bluff which overlooked the river. The estate came to be known as "Brokenstraw" which became the home and center of business for three generations of Irvine's descendants. Callender's son, Dr. William A. Irvine (1803–1886), expanded the store and diversified the family business, adding an iron foundry, a saw mill, a woolen mill, and eventually a few oil wells. This location is where the Irvine family's careers and lives centered over the next four generations.  Irvine was the plaintiff in the Supreme Court case Irvine v. Sims's Lessee which involved conflicting land claims between Irvine who had been granted Montour's Island by Pennsylvania for his service in the Revolutionary War, and Charles Simms of Virginia. The Court unanimously found in favor of Simms, who had the earlier claim.

In September 1790, Irvine became business partners with John and Charles Wilkens of Pittsburgh, "to carry on a special trade and business in buying and selling". Most of their investments were made in flour and whiskey which were mostly sold in the Ohio and upper Mississippi Valleys.

In the late 1790s, Irvine assumed a military role one last time, in response to another tax rebellion.  During 1797, rising tensions between France and the United States led the American government to seek financing with which to improve the military and prepare for what became the Quasi-War. To fund the war Congress levied a tax on houses and other property.  The new tax came to be known as the window tax, based on the size of a house as determined by the number of windows.  In response, citizens rebelled in what came to be called the Fries Rebellion which primarily involved the Dutch in Pennsylvania. Some tax collectors were driven out of towns and even imprisoned. To put down the rebellion President Adams ordered troops to move in and arrest the various men responsible.  Irvine joined the company marching for Quakertown. Irvine wrote to a friend, "The rust of time and age creeping on me, will I fear make me awkward in this business."  Despite his reservations, however, Irvine endured the ordeal and returned home safely. The rebellion would be Irvine's final active military service, though he continued working with the military.  In 1801, he was appointed superintendent of military stores in Philadelphia.

In 1801 Irvine was elected president of the State Society of the Cincinnati and held that office up until the time of his death.

Irvine died on July 29, 1804, in Philadelphia, Pennsylvania, where he was buried in a graveyard near Independence Hall. He was reburied in 1833 at the new Ronaldson's Cemetery. When it was closed in the 1950s, the graves of a few Revolutionary War officers such as Irvine were identified by the rector of Old Swedes' and reburied at Gloria Dei Church cemetery.

Papers
Most of Irvine's correspondence and other papers were passed on to his sons. His son William took possession of most of the letters that were addressed to Irvine, while the letters written by Irvine naturally ended up in a variety of places, including those among the Washington Papers. Irvine's correspondence from the early 1790s also includes discussions about the staff and curriculum at Dickinson College in Carlisle, Pennsylvania, the improvement of inland navigation in Pennsylvania, the aftermath of the French Revolution, and Irvine's business ventures with his business partners Charles and John Wilkins, Junior, of Pittsburgh. Much of his correspondence, including the Irvine-Newbold papers, are archived at the Historical Society of Pennsylvania.

See also

 James Irvine (Pennsylvania politician)

Notes and citations

Bibliography

External links
Irvine's biographic sketch at the U.S. Congress website

ExplorePAHistory.com
 The Irvine-Newbold Family Papers, including correspondence, scrapbooks, photographs, records and other materials beginning with General William Irvine and spanning over 200 years of family history, are available for research use at the Historical Society of Pennsylvania.

1741 births
1804 deaths
People from County Fermanagh
Continental Army generals
Continental Army officers from Pennsylvania
Continental Congressmen from Pennsylvania
18th-century American politicians
People from Enniskillen
Members of the United States House of Representatives from Pennsylvania
Kingdom of Ireland emigrants to the Thirteen Colonies
Burials at Gloria Dei (Old Swedes') Church